The Diocese of Castabala is a titular see in Turkey.

During Late Antiquity, the Diocese of Castabala was a suffragan to Anazarbus, the metropolis of the province of Cilicia Secunda.

The names of seven of its diocesan bishops are known.  The first, Maris, is spoken of in an apocryphal letter of Saint Ignatius, with another letter addressed to him. A bishop Moyses from Catabala was present at the Council of Nicaea in 325. Theophilus, a semi-Arian and friend of Saint Basil, was sent to Rome on an embassy with two colleagues. The last, Theodorus, attended the Trullan Council in 692.

No longer a residential bishopric, Castabala is listed by the Catholic Church as a titular see.

See also
 Catholic Church in Turkey

References

Catholic titular sees in Asia